Brenda Kay Shields is an American politician in the Missouri House of Representatives, elected in November 2018 to represent District 11, and is a member of the Republican Party (United States). Her district represents part of Buchanan County, Missouri.

Missouri House of Representatives

Committee assignments 

 Higher Education, Chairwoman
 Subcommittee on Appropriations - Education, Chairwoman
 Children and Families
 Budget
 Joint Committee on Child Abuse and Neglect

Electoral history

References 

Living people
Year of birth missing (living people)
Republican Party members of the Missouri House of Representatives
Women state legislators in Missouri
21st-century American women